The Sorbas Basin is a sedimentary basin around the town of Sorbas in Almeria Province in south-east Spain.  It is believed to have been formed by extension, between two fault-bounded blocks which rotated anti-clockwise to take up the compression resulting from Europe's collision with Africa.  The basin is filled with turbidites and evaporites of the Tortonian-Messinian ages of the Miocene Epoch.

It is a matter of some debate whether the basin dried out at the same time as the main Mediterranean basins.

Basin fill 
The basin is divided into the following members:
 At the bottom of the image, the house is constructed on the steep yellow cliffs of the resistant Azagador Member.
 The lower (whiter) and upper (yellower) Abad Marls, a Tortonian/Messinian series of turbidites featuring pronounced Milankovic (20,000 year precession) cyclicity, allowing chronostratigraphic dating; these fine muds are easily eroded.
 When the sea returned overdeepening the basin, salt water waterfalls eroded a 200 m depression patterned by 30 m deep gullies.
 the Messinian Yesares Member, a gypsum evaporite, forms the steep bluffs at the top of the valley; there is some debate about how conformable its contact with the Abad marls is.
 Pliocene deposits, rest unconformably on the top.
 Complexity of drawdown and reflooding complicate correlation of the ‘Salinity Crisis' stratigraphy.

Basin significance 

The basin was separated from the main Mediterranean basin during the Messinian salinity crisis; therefore the timing of the Yesares Member relative to the main basin evaporites is crucial to distinguish between models of how the Mediterranean dried out.

References 

Structural basins
Geology of Spain
Messinian
Miocene geology
Neogene Europe